"Confession Blues" is a song by The Mcson Trio released in 1949 as a single on the Down Beat Records label (later known as Swing Time). The single featured American rhythm and blues (R&B) musician Ray Charles on piano and vocals. The song was written by Charles under his birth name Ray Charles Robinson (listed on the recording credits as R. C. Robinson).

Charles moved to Seattle in 1948, where he formed The McSon Trio with guitarist G. D. "Gossie" McKee and bass player Milton S. Garret. In late 1948, Jack Lauderdale of Down Beat Records heard Charles play at the Seattle jazz club, The Rocking Chair. The next day, Lauderdale took Charles and his trio to a Seattle recording studio where they recorded "Confession Blues" and "I Love You, I Love You". In February 1949, the two songs were released as Down Beat record number 171 with "Confession Blues" as the B-side. The group's name—The McSon Trio—was inadvertently listed as The Maxin Trio on the record. "Confession Blues" became the first single by Charles record to chart. The song, as well as much of Charles' early work, was grounded in the style of Nat King Cole and Charles Brown. "Confession Blues" entered the charts in early April 1949 at No. 11 on the Billboard Best Selling Retail Race Records chart (renamed the Retail Rhythm & Blues Records chart a short time later). It peaked at No. 5 in mid-May 1949.

References

1949 singles
Ray Charles songs
Songs written by Ray Charles
1949 songs